Holyoke Community College (HCC) is a public community college in Holyoke, Massachusetts. It offers associate degrees and certificate programs, as well as a transfer program for students to earn credits for transfer to other colleges. It was the first community college established in Massachusetts, as it was founded by the city's school board in 1946, while others were subsequently chartered under state jurisdiction after 1960. HCC currently offers more than 100 associate degree and certificate options, as well as adult basic education/GED programs, education and training for business and industry, and noncredit community education classes. In a 2016 report on community colleges in the United States, the Aspen Institute and Columbia University's Community College Research Center cited HCC as among 2-year community colleges with best practices for student transfers to 4 year institutions such as the University of Massachusetts Amherst. Additionally among the 15 community colleges in Massachusetts, HCC has the highest percentage of student graduates completing associate degrees and certificate programs.

HCC is located on a  campus, and has satellite locations throughout the Pioneer Valley, including the HCC-MGM Culinary Arts Institute, the only culinary arts program at a Massachusetts college accredited by the American Culinary Federation.

The college participates in the Commonwealth Dual Enrollment Partnership (CDEP) and allows high school applicants to opt for full or part-time coursework to receive both high school and transferable college credit. Enrolled students may also complete certain coursework at Mount Holyoke and Smith College, as both share faculty with the community college. Holyoke Community College is accredited by the New England Commission of Higher Education.

History

Holyoke Community College's history is unique in that it was not only the first established community college in the state, but was initially managed municipally by the local school board. With funding provided by the GI Bill following World War II, the opportunity was granted to states to provide supplementary education in addition to coursework given through high school. In order to expedite the establishment of this coursework, the Massachusetts General Court passed an emergency act on June 13, 1946, to allow school committees to vote for post-graduate instruction. Following a period of evaluation, the Holyoke School Board voted in favor of establishing the Holyoke Graduate School on September 9, 1946, having admitted 67 students for its founding class. On April 1, 1947, this name was changed to the Holyoke Junior College after a state act was passed allowing municipalities to operate higher educational institutions under this title.

On July 1, 1964, with approval from the state department of education, the school board relinquished control and the college was given its current name, Holyoke Community College. On January 4, 1968, the Holyoke Community College building burned to the ground. Classes continued in various locations across Holyoke. A temporary campus was opened in June 1971 and the current campus opened on February 19, 1974.

With Bartley's retirement in 2004, William F. Messner became the third, and with his 2016 retirement the current president, Dr. Christina Royal, became the fourth and the first woman to serve the office.

In October 2019, the college announced it would launch the state's first Cannabis Education Center in partnership with the Cannabis Community Care and Research Network (C3RN). The program provides certificate training for patient advocates, budtenders, extraction and laboratory roles, as well as offerings within its culinary program.

Foundation

Following a devastating fire that destroyed the then-refurbished college building (the former Alderman Holyoke High School), the yellow bricks from the former facility were sold off to raise funds for an independent charitable corporation, created by Mayor William S. Taupier. This charity, known as the Friends of Holyoke Community College, was initially founded for the purpose of conducting fundraising to construct new facilities. The idea of rebuilding such a school in Holyoke was left in doubt by the state but after hundreds of letters and phone calls from residents to Governor Volpe, funding was granted for an entirely new campus in the Homestead Avenue neighborhood. The Friends of Holyoke Community College would be renamed the Holyoke Community College Foundation in 1985, a separate 501(c)(3) nonprofit organization which fundraises to supplement state appropriations to the college through benefactor scholarships, educational grants, and the annually-awarded Elaine Marieb Faculty Chair for Teaching Excellence. As of 2018, the foundation presided over the largest endowment of any community college foundation in the Commonwealth.

Campus

Locations
In addition to the main campus on in the Homestead Avenue area of Holyoke, the community college also maintains a number of satellite campuses, generally associated with specific programs, including:
 Center for Health Education, 404 Jarvis Avenue, Holyoke
 Education to Employment Center, 79 Main Street, Ware
 HCC-MGM Culinary Arts Center, 164 Race Street, Holyoke
 Ludlow Area Adult Learning Center, 54 Winsor Street, Ludlow
 Picknelly Adult & Family Education Center, Holyoke Transportation Center, 206 Maple Street, Holyoke

Notable alumni

 Craig Blais, American poet and scholar, assistant professor of English at Anna Maria College, recipient of the Felix Pollak Prize in Poetry, with published works in The Antioch Review and Yale Review.
 Richard H. Demers, former mayor of Chicopee, Massachusetts, and former member of House of Representatives, real estate developer.
 Michael J. Kittredge II, founder of the Yankee Candle Company.
 Luis Daniel Muñiz, Puerto Rican politician and senator for the Mayagüez-Aguadilla district.
 Henry P. Monaghan, constitutional law scholar, professor at Columbia Law School
 Richard Neal, former city councilor and mayor of Springfield, Massachusetts, member of the US House of Representatives representing the 1st district of Massachusetts.
 Patty O'Donnell, former member of the Vermont House of Representatives, and member of the school board of Vernon, Vermont.
 Joe Peters, artist whose work has been featured in the Corning Museum of Glass.
 Todd Smola, member of the Massachusetts House of Representatives representing the 1st Hampden district.
 Aaron Vega, member of the Massachusetts House of Representatives representing the 5th Hampden district, serving on the Joint Committee on Higher Education, former documentary film editor with previous work with Ken Burns

See also
 WCCH (103.5 FM), the community college's FM radio station

Notes

References

External links
 Official website
 High School/Dual Enrollment Program, Holyoke Community College
 Holyoke Community College Foundation, Inc., a private 501(c)(3) charity foundation which supplements state appropriations
 2017 Annual Report

 
1946 establishments in Massachusetts
Buildings and structures in Holyoke, Massachusetts
Community colleges in Massachusetts
Educational institutions established in 1946
NJCAA athletics
Schools in Holyoke, Massachusetts
Two-year colleges in the United States
Universities and colleges in Hampden County, Massachusetts